The 2016 Oregon State Beavers baseball team represented Oregon State University in the 2016 NCAA Division I baseball season.  The Beavers played their home games at Goss Stadium at Coleman Field and as members of the Pac-12 Conference.  The team was coached by Pat Casey in his 22nd season at Oregon State.

References

Oregon State Beavers baseball seasons
Oregon State
2016 in sports in Oregon